In the run-up to the 2022 Danish general election, various organisations carried out opinion polling to gauge voting intentions in Denmark. Results of such polls are displayed in this list.

The date range for these opinion polls are from the 2019 Danish general election, held on 5 June, to the present day. The Constitution of Denmark specifies that the next election must be held no later than four years after the previous election. On 5 October 2022, the government called a snap election to be held on 1 November.

Graphical summary

Opinion polls

2022

2021

2020

2019

Faroe Islands

Greenland

Preferred Prime Minister

All party leaders 

These polls asked participants their preferred prime minister among all party leaders. Only Mette Frederiksen, Pape Poulsen, and Elleman-Jensen have actually declared their candidacy.

Frederiksen vs. Pape Poulsen vs. Ellemann-Jensen

Ellemann-Jensen vs. Pape Poulsen

See also 

 Opinion polling for the 2015 Danish general election
 Opinion polling for the 2019 Danish general election

Notes

References 

Next